Thiago Alberto Constância (born 21 December 1984) is a Brazilian footballer who most recently played for Hong Kong First Division League club Sun Pegasus. He was also known as Thiagão in his early career.

Biography
Born in São Paulo, Brazil, Thiago left for União Bandeirante in 2005. In June 2005 he signed a 3-year contract with Cabofriense. He played once for the club at 2005 Campeonato Brasileiro Série C, on 28 August 2005. He replaced Tenório at half time. The match Cabofriense won Volta Redonda 1–0. He failed to make any appearances in 2006 Campeonato Brasileiro Série C.

In August 2006, Thiago returned to São Paulo state, signed a -year contract with Bragantino. That calendar year Bragantino failed to qualify for national league and participated in 2006 Copa FPF.

In October 2006 he completed a transfer to Moldovan side Sheriff Tiraspol along with Nadson José Ferreira.

In June 2008 he left for Romanian club Dinamo București, reported cost €450,000.

In October 2010, Thiago moved to Ukraine for Karpaty Lviv, signed a 3-year contract, re-joined Aleh Konanaw, former assistant coach of Sheriff.

In late September 2012, Thiago joined Hong Kong First Division League side Sun Pegasus. He played 6 games and scored 2 goals for the club.

In 2013, Thiago joined Santa Catarina state CA1 side Camboriu to play the second half of the state league Championship, he played 6 games and scored 2 goals for the club.

Honours
Copa Paulista de Futebol: 2006 (Bragantino)
Moldovan National Division: 2007, 2008
Moldovan Cup: 2008
Moldovan Super Cup: 2007

References

External links
 
 

Brazilian footballers
Brazilian expatriate footballers
Expatriate footballers in the Netherlands
Expatriate footballers in Moldova
Expatriate footballers in Romania
Expatriate footballers in Ukraine
Brazilian expatriate sportspeople in Ukraine
Feyenoord players
Guarani FC players
Paraná Clube players
União Bandeirante Futebol Clube players
Associação Desportiva Cabofriense players
Clube Atlético Bragantino players
FC Sheriff Tiraspol players
FC Dinamo București players
FC Karpaty Lviv players
Liga I players
Ukrainian Premier League players
Association football midfielders
Footballers from São Paulo
1984 births
Living people
Expatriate footballers in Hong Kong
Hong Kong First Division League players
TSW Pegasus FC players